Kothavalasa is a Suburb in Visakhapatnam  city but present in Vizianagaram district of the Indian state of Andhra Pradesh. It is located in Kothavalasa mandal of Vizianagaram revenue division. It is located 30 km from the city of Visakhapatanam

Geography
It has an average elevation of 209 meters (688 feet).

Transport
Kothavalasa has a railway station which is under jurisdiction of Erstwhile East Coast Railway and present South Coast Railway

Demographics
 India census, Kothavalasa had a population of 17,433. Males constitute 50% of the population and females 50%. Kothavalasa has an average literacy rate of 69%, higher than the national average of 59.5%: male literacy is 76%, and female literacy is 62%. In Kothavalasa, 12% of the population is under 6 years of age.

Kothavalasa mandal had a population of 62,841 in 2001. Males consists of 31,428 and females 31,413 (M:E ratio=1:1) of the population. The average literacy rate of the mandal population is 60%. Male literacy rate is 72% and that of females 48%.

Education
The primary and secondary school education is imparted by government, aided and private schools, under the School Education Department of the state. The medium of instruction followed by different schools are English, Telugu.

See also
 Kothavalasa railway station

References

Census towns in Andhra Pradesh
Mandal headquarters in Vizianagaram district
Neighbourhoods in Visakhapatnam